The Embassy of the Republic of Indonesia in Prague is the diplomatic mission of the Republic of Indonesia to the Czech Republic. The embassy was originally Indonesia's diplomatic mission to Czechoslovakia. After the country's split into the Czech Republic and Slovakia, the embassy became the diplomatic mission for the former. The first Indonesia ambassador to Czechoslovakia was Rudolf Alexander Asmaun in 1957. The current ambassador to the Czech Republic is Kenssy Dwi Ekaningsih who was appointed by President Joko Widodo on 13 February 2019.

See also 
 Czech Republic–Indonesia relations
 List of diplomatic missions of Indonesia

Gallery

References 

Prague
Indonesia
Smíchov
Czechoslovakia–Indonesia relations